The Cat Concerto is a 1947 American one-reel animated cartoon and is the 29th Tom and Jerry short, released to theatres on April 26, 1947. It was produced by Fred Quimby and directed by William Hanna and Joseph Barbera, with musical supervision by Scott Bradley, and animation by Kenneth Muse, Ed Barge and Irven Spence and uncredited animation by Don Patterson.

Following its release, it was met with critical acclaim, and is considered one of the best Tom and Jerry cartoons. It won the 1946 Oscar for Best Short Subject: Cartoons. In 1994, it was voted #42 of the 50 Greatest Cartoons of all time by members of the animation field.

The short won the duo their fourth consecutive Academy Award for Best Animated Short Film, tied with Walt Disney Productions' musical series, the Silly Symphonies. The short also appears in Empire magazine's The 500 Greatest Movies of All Time list as the number 434.

Plot
In a formal concert in Mumbai, Tom, in a white tie as the soloist, is performing a piano version of Franz Liszt's "Hungarian Rhapsody No. 2". Jerry, living and sleeping inside the piano, is rudely awakened, then sits on top of the piano to mock the cat by "conducting" him. Tom flicks Jerry off the piano and continues playing.

Jerry arises from under one of the keys. Tom plays tremolo on this key, hammering Jerry's head with it, and then unsuccessfully tries to smash the mouse beneath the keys. When Tom lifts his fingers, the piano continues playing by itself, with Jerry manipulating the felts from inside. To quiet him, Tom whacks Jerry with a tuning tool. In retaliation, Jerry slams the piano keyboard lid onto Tom's fingers and then pops out on the far right of the piano to attempt to cut Tom's finger with a pair of scissors as he plays a very high note. After six misses, Jerry substitutes a mousetrap for the white keys just below it. Tom plays the keys on either side for a few seconds, but eventually his finger gets caught in the trap.

Jerry prances up and down on the piano, upon which Tom climbs onto the piano in pursuit, continuing to play with his feet. As Tom gets back down on his seat, Jerry dances around on the felts, momentarily changing the tune ("On the Atchison, Topeka and the Santa Fe"). Tom then plays a chord where Jerry is bounced repeatedly, while making insulting faces at the cat with each bounce, Tom eventually catches Jerry and throws him into the piano stool. Jerry then crawls out of an opening and manipulates the seat's controls, cranking it up and sending it crashing down, causing Tom to land on the keys.

Now completely fed up, Tom stuffs Jerry into the felts and then goes crazy on the piano. The felts start bashing Jerry about, spanking him, and squashing him to and fro. Eventually, Jerry emerges in a very angry mood, breaks off some felts and, using them as drumsticks, plays the finale of the rhapsody in one last retaliation. Jerry constantly increases the tempo of his playing, and even includes two false endings, causing Tom to collapse in exhaustion at the end of the rhapsody, the sleeves of his tailcoat now hanging around his wrists. The audience then applauds for the performance, and Jerry takes the praise for himself as a spotlight shines on him.

Reception

Critical response
Film critic The Chiel of Australian newspaper The Age declared The Cat Concerto to be the best film of 1947, above Odd Man Out and Brief Encounter, stating that "in conception and animation I think that short reaches the highest level of screen fantasy and humor."

Plagiarism dispute
The same year MGM produced The Cat Concerto, Warner Bros. released a very similar Bugs Bunny cartoon called Rhapsody Rabbit, directed by Friz Freleng, with Bugs against an unnamed mouse. Both shorts used near identical gags, the same piece by Franz Liszt, and had similar endings. Both MGM and Warner Bros. accused each other of plagiarism, after both films were submitted for the 1947 Academy Awards ceremony. Technicolor was accused of sending a print of either cartoon to the competing studio, which then allegedly plagiarized their rival's work. This remains uncertain even today, though Rhapsody Rabbit has an earlier MPAA copyright number and release date while The Cat Concerto had a more advanced production number at #165 while all the other shorts released near the same period had a lower production number in the 150s range. By pure coincidence, as of 1997 both shorts are now under ownership of Turner Entertainment and Warner Bros., following a series of mergers and acquisitions. The controversy was made into an episode of the Cartoon Network anthology series ToonHeads.

Availability
VHS
 Tom and Jerry's Greatest Chases Vol. 1

DVD
Tom and Jerry's Greatest Chases, Vol. 1
Warner Bros. Home Entertainment Academy Awards Animation Collection: 15 Winners
Tom and Jerry: Deluxe Anniversary Collection Disc One
Tom and Jerry Golden Collection Volume One, Disc Two
Tom and Jerry: Musical Mayhem
Blu-ray
Tom and Jerry Golden Collection Volume One, Disc Two
Streaming
Amazon Prime Video (UK)
HBO Max (US)

References

External links
The Cat Concerto, a section of Nicola Watts' "Cartoons and Music" 1997 Multimedia Analysis and Design project at the Humanities Advanced Technology and Information Institute (HATII) at the University of Glasgow.
Peter Gimpel, son of Jakob Gimpel explaining his view of the controversy
 Yannie Tan plays the Cat Concerto - Tom and Jerry - Hungarian Rhapsody No.2 by Franz Liszt. Musical performance recorded at Peachtree Presbyterian Church, June 2017, shown in parallel with the 1947 cartoon.

1947 films
1947 short films
1947 animated films
1940s American animated films
1940s animated short films
1947 musical comedy films
American musical comedy films
Best Animated Short Academy Award winners
Animated films about music and musicians
Short films directed by William Hanna
Short films directed by Joseph Barbera
Tom and Jerry short films
Films scored by Scott Bradley
Animated films without speech
Metro-Goldwyn-Mayer animated short films
Films produced by Fred Quimby
Film controversies
Films involved in plagiarism controversies
Metro-Goldwyn-Mayer cartoon studio short films